Phiala punctulata is a moth in the family Eupterotidae. It was described by Pagenstecher in 1903. It is found in Malawi and Somalia.

References

Moths described in 1903
Eupterotinae